is a tsukiyama Japanese garden located within  in Kumamoto Prefecture, Japan. The main tsukiyama is a representation of Mount Fuji.  Lord Hosokawa Tadatoshi began construction of the garden in 1636 as a tea retreat. The park was named after a no-longer-extant Buddhist temple called Suizen-ji, and now hosts the Izumi Shrine, where members of the Hosokawa family are enshrined, and a Nōgaku-dō, a Noh theater. Lord Hosokawa selected this site because of its spring-fed pond, the clean water of which was excellent for tea. 
The thatched Kokin-Denju-no-Ma teahouse was originally in Kyoto's Imperial Palace, but was moved here in 1912.

The garden has been declared by the national government a historic site of scenic beauty.

Suizenji Park
Suizenji Kōen is an interesting and much visited venue, featuring miniature landscapes, a temple and small lakes containing large, hungry, and multi-coloured carp. It is a short tram ride from the city. Nearby, there are many souvenir and snack shops.

See also

History of Kumamoto Prefecture

Gallery

Notes

References
Explore Japan, Suizenji Garden accessed on August 31, 2009

Bibliography

Gardens in Japan
Gardens in Kumamoto Prefecture
Higo-Hosokawa clan
Kumamoto